The  is a Japanese railway line located in Akita Prefecture in northern Japan.

Service outlines
Trains on the line are operated as "Local" (all-stations), "Rapid", "Special Rapid", and the Moriyoshi Express service.

Station list
Transfers are available only at Takanosu (JR Ou Main Line) and Kakunodate (JR Tazawako Line and Akita Shinkansen).
 Local trains stop all stations.
 Rapid = You can ride on only fare.
 Express Moriyoshi ＝ Express fare costs 160 yen when you ride on this train by 50 km, 320 yen when you ride on this train at 51 km and over.
 ●：All trains stop
◆・▲・▼：Partly trains stop（▲：Only inbound、▼：Only outbound）
｜：Pass

History

Aniai Line

Kakunodate Line
However construction was suspended in 1980 due to JNR funding constraints.

Closure
The Kakunodate Line was closed by JNR on 11 September 1981, and the Aniai Line on 22 June 1984.

Reopening
The third-sector Akita Nairiku Jūkan Railway Company reopened both the Aniai Line (as the Akita Nairiku Kita Line) and the Kakunodate Line (as the Akita Nairiku Minami Line) on November 1, 1986. It also recommenced construction of the suspended link (known as the New Line) which opened on April 1, 1989 creating the current through-route.

See also
List of railway companies in Japan
List of railway lines in Japan

References

External links 
  

Railway lines in Japan
Rail transport in Akita Prefecture
1067 mm gauge railways in Japan
Railway lines opened in 1989
Companies based in Akita Prefecture
Japanese third-sector railway lines